Gjakova Airport AMIKO (Aerodrom Đakovica) is an airport in village Lugbunar, near Gjakova in western Kosovo. The airport is expected to become public in the following years, to be used by low-cost commercial airlines and cargo flights.

History
The airport was built by the Kosovo Force (KFOR) following the 1999 Kosovo War, next to an existing airfield used for agricultural purposes, and was used mainly for military and humanitarian flights. On 18 December 2013, the airport was handed over to the Government of Kosovo from the Italian Air Force. Under Italian Air Force operations, Gjakova Airfield handled more than 27,000 aircraft, 220,000 passengers and the carriage of more than 40,000 tons of cargo.

The local and national government plans to offer Gjakova Airport for operation under a public-private partnership with the aim of turning it into a civilian and commercial airport.

As of December 2015, the airport is reported as closed by the Kosovo authorities.

See also

Alenia C-27J Spartan
Radoniq lake
Batlava-Donja Penduha Airfield in Dumosh

Annotations

References

External links

Gjakova Airport aerial photo 

Airports in Kosovo
Gjakova